Zhou Yu's Train is a 2002 Chinese film, based on a novella by Bei Cun,  directed by Sun Zhou, and starring Gong Li and Tony Leung Ka-Fai.

The title refers to a poetic compilation published by the character in the movie played by Leung. The story starts at a book signing event and leads to the memories of the two lovers encounters. Zhou Yu maintained the relationship by commuting on the train, hence the title of the movie.

Tagline: Her love is torn between a doctor and a poet.

Synopsis 

The story is set in Chongyang (Hubei province, China) and Sanming (Fujian province).
Zhou Yu, a ceramics artist from Sanming falls in love with the poet Chen Qing, who lives in Chongyang, a town several hundred kilometers from Sanming. During the train trips between Sanming and Chongyang, she also meets Zhang Qiang, a veterinary surgeon.

Gong Li plays two characters who only differ by their hair styles, namely Zhou Yu and the short-haired Xiu.  The film is pieced together with many flashbacks in no particular chronological order. The relationship between the two women is unclear until the end of the film.

External links
 Official website with synopsis, cast & crew, comments on production, and trailers (requires Flash).
 
 
 
 Kaori Shoji: Gong Li back on board, but on the wrong track. The Japan Times, Wednesday, Sept. 24, 2003.
 Michael O'Sullivan: Melodrama Derails 'Zhou Yu's Train'. The Washington Post Friday, August 27, 2004; Page WE31
 Derek Elley: Zhou Yu's Train / Zhou Yu de Huoche (China-Hong Kong). Variety Wed., Mar. 5, 2003.
 Dave Kehr: Zhou Yu's Train (2003): Torn Between a Dreamy Idealist and a Veterinarian. New York Times July 16, 2004.
 Graham Fuller: Shots in the dark: the reality of the rails may be all iron and steel, but when it comes to the movies, they're magic. February 2005.

2002 films
2000s Mandarin-language films
2002 romantic drama films
Sony Pictures Classics films
Rail transport films
Films scored by Shigeru Umebayashi
Chinese romantic drama films
Films directed by Sun Zhou
2000s Chinese films